The 1993 Northeast Conference baseball tournament was held in May 1993 at Moody Park in Ewing Township, New Jersey.  The league's top four teams competed in the double elimination tournament.  Third-seeded  won their first and only tournament championship.

Seeding and format
The top four finishers were seeded one through four based on conference regular-season winning percentage.  They played a double-elimination tournament.

Bracket

Most Valuable Player
John Gambale of St. Francis was named Tournament Most Valuable Player.

References

Tournament
Northeast Conference Baseball Tournament
Northeast Conference baseball tournament
Northeast Conference baseball tournament